The Royal Society is the national academy of Thailand in charge of academic works of the government.

The secretariat of the society is the Office of the Royal Society, formerly known as the Royal Institute. The office is an independent agency under the prime minister's supervision.

The Royal Society was established on 19 April 1926 and was dissolved on 31 March 1934. The dissolved society was split into the Royal Institute and the Fine Arts Department. On 14 February 2015, the Royal Institute was reorganised. Its administrative council became the Royal Society, whilst the institute itself became the office of the society.

According to the present structure, the members of the Royal Society are of three types: associate fellows, fellows, and honorary fellows. The associate fellows are experts selected and appointed by the society. The fellows are associate fellows selected by the society and appointed by the monarch upon advice of the prime minister. And the honorary fellows are prominent experts selected by the society and appointed in the same manner as the fellows.

The society is known for its role in the planning and regulation of the Thai language, as well as its many publications, particularly the Royal Institute Dictionary, the official and prescriptive dictionary of the Thai language, and the Royal Thai General System of Transcription (RTGS), the official system for romanising Thai words.

The budget allocated to the Royal Society for FY2019 is 192.2 million baht.

History

On 19 April 1926, the Royal Society was established by King Prajadhipok. The society was later dissolved on 31 March 1933 and its divisions were incorporated into two new agencies. The academic divisions became the Royal Institute. The archaeological divisions became the Fine Arts Department.

According to the Act on Royal Institute, 1934, which took effect on 24 April 1934, the institute was a juristic person sponsored by the government and the prime minister was in charge of the institute. The act gave the institute three main duties: to conduct research in all fields and publish the outcomes for the common good of the nation, to exchange knowledge with foreign academic bodies, and to provide academic opinions to the government and public agencies. Under the act, the institute members were selected by the institute itself and were appointed by the monarch upon approval of the cabinet and the House of Representatives.

On 1 April 1942, the Royal Institute Act, 1942, entered into force. The act changed the status of the institute from a juristic person to a public organisation and authorised the prime minister to directly command the institute. The act also modified the method of selecting the institute members. The members were selected and nominated to the monarch by the prime minister.

On 31 December 1944, the Royal Institute Act (No. 2), 1944, came into operation. It again modified the institute status and the member selection method. The institute became an independent department commanded by the prime minister and its members were selected by the institute itself and were appointed by the monarch upon advice of the prime minister.

On 12 March 1952, the Administrative Reorganisation Act, 1952, became operative. It changed the commander of the institute from the prime minister to the culture minister. On 1 September 1958, the Administrative Reorganisation Act (No. 6), 1958, became effective. It again changed the commander of the institute from the culture minister to the education minister.

On 29 September 1972, Field Marshal Thanom Kittikachorn, leader of a junta called Revolutionary Council, issued the Revolutionary Council Announcement No. 216 which once again modified the status of the institute. According to the announcement, the institute changed its status from an independent department to a government department which was not subject to any other agency and was commanded by the education minister.

On 13 November 2001, the Royal Institute Act, 2001, entered into operation. Under the act, the institute was a government department which was not subject to any other agency. The act also improved the structure of the institute and increased its missions.

On 14 February 2015, the Royal Society Act, 2015, came into force and reorganised the institute. Under the act, the administrative council of the institute, then known as the Council of Fellows (สภาราชบัณฑิต), became the Royal Society, and the institute became the secretariat of the society, known as the Office of the Royal Society. The act granted many new powers to the office, including the powers to manage its own budgets, to provide advanced training in all academic fields of the society, and to confer certificates upon the trainees. A welfare fund for the society members was also established by the act. Many of the fellows objected to renaming the institute because no public hearing on the matter was held.

Location

On 21 August 2006, the society relocated to offices at Sanam Suea Pa, near the Royal Plaza in Bangkok. Previously, the society was located in the Grand Palace, Bangkok.

Administration
For administrative purposes, the society has four divisions:
Secretariat General
Moral and Political Sciences Division
Science Division
Arts Division

The society's website states that each division has a staff of civil servants and clerical employees who perform both business and academic functions facilitating the works of fellows and associate fellows as well as conducting and promoting various academic activities.

Fellows
Scholars from the academic community of Thailand can apply for membership in the society. Acceptance is based on an applicant's contributions to his field and his published works. The levels of membership in the institute are:
 Honorary fellows (ราชบัณฑิตกิตติมศักดิ์)
 Fellows (ราชบัณฑิต)
 Associate fellows (ภาคีสมาชิก)

Of these, only the title of associate fellow can be applied for. Fellows are appointed by the monarch as senior experts in the society within their field, chosen from among the existing associate fellows. Honorary fellows are likewise appointed by the monarch and are chosen from among scholars who are not already fellows of the society. These three groups can be collectively referred to as the members of the society.

Academies
Fellows of the society are divided into three academies. Each academy is subdivided into branches, and each branch includes several specific fields, totalling 137 different academic disciplines.

Academy of Moral and Political Sciences

Academy of Science

Academy of Arts

Seal 

The official seal of the society is a shining sword behind an open book bearing a Pali word, paṇḍito ("scholars"). A crown floats upon the sword and a ribbon bearing the name of the society is below the book.

The sword and the book is based upon a saying, "wisdom is on a par with weapon" (ปัญญาประดุจดังอาวุธ). The light of the sword represents the light of wisdom. The crown represents the monarch.

Works

Royal Institute Dictionary

Perhaps the most well-known work of the society is the prescriptive Royal Institute Dictionary (พจนานุกรม ฉบับราชบัณฑิตยสถาน, in English often abbreviated RID).

The society has published four fully revised editions of the dictionary, and many intermittent reprintings with minor revisions. Each of the major revisions is associated with a significant year in Thai history, although in the case of the 1999 and 2011 editions, the actual publication date is a later year.

Spelling guidelines
The Royal Society publishes guidelines for spelling loanwords in Thai.

In 2012, a proposed change brought about concerns and criticism among the public, when Professor Kanchana Naksakul, an RIT senior fellow, proposed the new spellings of Thai words borrowed from English. Thai words borrowed from English are spelled without tone marks, although they are pronounced tonally. The new spellings would add the marks to them.

Kanchana said that the new spellings were identified by the survey of some 300 people in the language circles who were of the same opinion that the spellings would better reflect how the words are pronounced in Thai and would assist the foreigners in learning Thai language.

The proposal was supported by the Ministry of Education and by many higher education lecturers, including those from Chulalongkorn University. But it met with heavy objections from secondary education teachers and the general public. Those objecting based their opinions on the fact that the survey was conducted on a small group of people and that English is not a tonal language and, therefore, Thai words borrowed from it need not to contain tone marks unless necessary. Some critics, including Kitmanoch Rojanasupya or Kru Lilly, a renowned Thai language teacher, expressed their concern that the proposal would turn Thai language system into turmoil. They also remarked that it is foreign learners who should adapt to Thai language structure, not to adjust the latter to the former.

On 1 October 2012, RIT secretary general Kanokwalee Chuchaiya declared that the proposal was merely a proposal and was pending internal proceedings scheduled to be concluded in December of that year. She confirmed that public hearings would be held on the new spellings, and that the 2011 dictionary does not contain these spellings, as its printing had already been completed. The situation also prompted RIT president, Professor Panya Borisut, to hold a rare press conference on the morning of 3 October.

On 17 December 2012, the RIT senate voted against the proposal, putting an end to it as a result.

Royal Thai General System of Transcription

The society publishes the Royal Thai General System of Transcription or RTGS, the official way of transcribing Thai into the Latin alphabet.

References

External links

 (in Thai)

 
Government agencies established in 1926
1926 establishments in Siam
Language regulators
Government departments of Thailand
Thailand